Gilman is a village and municipality in the state of Yap, Federated States of Micronesia. It lies on the south side of the Yap island. Six villages or hamlets are integrated there : Anoth, Gachlaw, Guror, Magchagil, Thabeth and Towoway. The population was 252 in 2010.

References
Statoids.com, retrieved February 12, 2015

Municipalities of Yap